Vulpius is a surname. Notable people with the surname include:
 Christian August Vulpius (1762–1827), German novelist and dramatist
 Christiane Vulpius (1765–1816), wife of Johann Wolfgang Goethe, sister of Christian August Vulpius
 Johann Samuel Vulpius (1760–1846), German botanist
 Melchior Vulpius (c. 1570–1615), German singer and composer
 Paul Vulpius (1880–1957), German singer and composer